The Dr. Martin G. Brumbaugh Graded School (Spanish: Escuela de la Comunidad Dr. Martin G. Brumbaugh), located in Santa Isabel Pueblo, Puerto Rico, was built in 1906 and was added to the National Register of Historic Places (NRHP) in 2011. It is named after 26th Governor of Pennsylvania and educator Martin Grove Brumbaugh.

It is located near the town square of Santa Isabel Pueblo. It was deemed significant as "one of the oldest and best kept early twentieth century schools in Puerto Rico", and it was stated that the property retains most of its physical features, its mass, spatial relationship, and proportion and construction materials. The Dr. Martin G. Brumbaugh Graded School is of statewide significance under Criterion C in Architecture as listed in the NRHP as the property represents the early twentieth century methods of construction applied to educational facilities in Puerto Rico, harmonically combining three distinctively construction periods. Just as important, the property is of statewide significance under Criterion A in Social History, as it is one of the best examples in the early stage of the social project undertaken by the United States in Puerto Rico to promote the education combined with the political project of promoting the American values and the acculturation process in every part of Puerto Rico.

The school was closed in 2018.

References

Neoclassical architecture in Puerto Rico
School buildings on the National Register of Historic Places in Puerto Rico
Santa Isabel, Puerto Rico
School buildings completed in 1906
1906 establishments in Puerto Rico
Elementary schools in Puerto Rico